George Bernard Frazer (28 December 1933 – 20 January 2018), or Bernard Frazer was a Sierra Leonean medical doctor who was a gynaecologist based in Freetown, Sierra Leone.

Early life
George Bernard Frazer was born on 28 December 1933 in Freetown, Sierra Leone to Sierra Leonean parents of Creole provenance, Theophilus Frazer of Murray Town, Sierra Leone and Martha Frazer, née Peters.

Education
Frazer was educated at the University of Aberdeen and qualified as a medical doctor in 1963.

Career
Dr Bernard Frazer returned to Sierra Leone and established a gynaecology practice at Wellington Street, Freetown.

Death
George Bernard Frazer died on 20 January 2018.

References
https://awokonewspaper.com/%E2%80%9Cfor-high-infant-and-maternal-mortality-we-are-all-guilty%E2%80%9D-dr-frazer/
https://www.goafricaonline.com/en/sl/30969-dr-bernard-frazer-gynecologue-freetown-sierra-leone

Sierra Leone Creole people
Sierra Leonean people of Scottish descent
1933 births
2018 deaths